Little Swan River may refer to one of the following rivers or places:

Canada
Little Swan River (Ontario), a river
Little Swan River, Saskatchewan, a settlement
United States
Little Swan River (Minnesota), a river

See also
Swan River (disambiguation)